The Green Mountain Glades is a Tier III Junior A ice hockey team in the Eastern Junior Hockey League's North Division from 2000-2017.

Overview
The team played its home games at Cairns Arena, a 600-seat arena in the suburb of South Burlington, Vermont, as well as the 4,003-seat Gutterson Fieldhouse on the campus of the University of Vermont on certain occasions.

The Green Mountain Glades organization also fielded a team in the Empire Junior B Hockey League as well as youth hockey select teams at the Bantam, Peewee, and Squirt levels.

Notable alumni
 Matt Campanale
 Zemgus Girgensons - 14th overall pick of the Buffalo Sabres in the 2012 NHL Entry Draft

External links
 

Ice hockey teams in Vermont
Sports in Burlington, Vermont